The Miami Military Institute (MMI) was a military college located in Germantown, Ohio, which operated between 1894 and 1933.

The school's parade grounds were on the current location of the Veteran's park in Germantown.

History 
In 1885, Orvon Graff Brown leased a propriety in Germantown and used it to establish Twin Valley College and Ohio Conservatory of Music. In 1894 the music program was dropped in favor of military studies. The school operated until closing its doors in 1934, due to the drop in enrollment due to the Great Depression.

Almost 150 cadets of the academy served in World War I, more than half of them as commissioned officers. Seven of these cadets died in the conflict.

Post-MMI building history 
From the 1940s to the 1980s, the building that was once the MMI acted as a Methodist camp, and was affectionately known as "Camp Miami" by locals. It was later a very popular location for Urban exploration from the 1990s to 2015.

By 2015, however, the building had been heavily vandalized. Most of the exterior windows had been broken by vandals and urban explorers trying to gain entry, and the roof was on the verge of collapsing due to lack of maintenance. Restoration costs were far too high, so during the summer of 2015, the buildings on the site were demolished, and the asphalt parking lot removed. As of 2016, the only remaining structure on the site is the MMI's flagpole. The school's infirmary still stands, on South Main Street in Germantown.

Museum displays 
Artifacts from the MMI can be found on display at both the Germantown historical society museum, located on West Center Street, and at the Veteran's Memorial Museum, located on South Main Street.

References 

Defunct private universities and colleges in Ohio
Military schools in the United States
Germantown, Ohio